The Barra Grande Hydroelectric Power Plant is a dam and hydroelectric power plant on the Pelotas River near Celso Ramos on the border of Santa Catarina and Rio Grande do Sul, Brazil. The power station has a 708 MW capacity and is supplied with water by a concrete face rock-fill embankment dam, the second tallest dam in Brazil. It is owned and operated by Energética Barra Grande SA (BAESA) and produces a 30% equivalent of the demand in Santa Catarina.

Background
Construction on the dam began in May 2001 by the consortium BAESA whose stakeholders include Alcoa 42.2%, Companhia Paulista de Força e Luz (CPFL) 25%, Companhia Brasileira de Alumínio (CBA) 15%, Camargo Corrêa Cimentos 9%, and DME Energética 8.8%. On 1 November 2005, the first generator went into operation, the second in February 2006 and the third in May of the same year. In September 2005 after construction was complete and the reservoir began to fill, the concrete face on the upstream side of the dam cracked, causing a leak of 1280 liters/s. In June 2007, soil was dumped in the area which reduced the leak to 800 L/s. The dam still remains safe.

Barra Grande Dam

Controversy
Construction of the dam required clearing  of araucaria, a Brazilian pine tree, of which only 1% to 7% of their original forest survives. Other species threatened by the reservoir were the endangered bromeliad Dyckia distachya and Paraná. The environmental controversy require BAESA to extend and acquire new licenses along with spending extra money on programs.

See also

Machadinho Hydroelectric Power Plant
Itá Hydroelectric Power Plant
List of power stations in Brazil

References

Energy infrastructure completed in 2005
Energy infrastructure completed in 2006
Hydroelectric power stations in Brazil
Dams in Rio Grande do Sul
Dams in Santa Catarina (state)